Iosif Igorevich Prigozhin (born 2 April 1969, Makhachkala, Dagestan ASSR, RSFSR, USSR) is а  Russian music producer of singers Valeria, Natalia Vetlitskaya, Vakhtang Kikabidze, Nikolai Noskov, Aleksandr Marshal, Avraam Russo, Kristina Orbakaitė, Didulya and many others. He is the creator of the record label , the organizer of Russian musical festivals, concerts, and television programs.

Biography 
Iosif Igorevich Prigozhin was born on 2 April 1969 in Makhachkala. His origin is half Ashkenazi and half Mountain Jewish. Father – Igor Matveevich Prigozhin (1938–1990), mother – Dinara Yakubovna Prigozhina (born 1940). He started his career at the age of 12 – he worked as a hairdresser, at the age of 16 he arrived in Moscow. In 1986 he graduated from the Moscow evening school No. 87 on Izmailovsky Boulevard. Не had classes at the theatrical studio "Gamma". Then there was the first attempt to enter the Lunacharsky State Institute for Theatre Arts (GITIS). In 1994 Joseph Prigozhin entered the GITIS.  Without leaving his intense creative and administrative activities, he got the higher education having graduated from the Institute in 2000 on the "Drama Manager" specialty.

From 1987 to 1990 Iosif Prigozhin worked as a tour manager of the concert programs. At the same time he sang on stage, released an audiocassette with recordings of his own songs. He started his active tour life in 1988. Since then he has organized more than 1,500 concerts with pop stars throughout the former Soviet Union. In 1989 Iosif Prigozhin was an administrator and organizer of the first fashion show by Valentin Yudashkin in the Moscow Variety Theatre.  Prigozhin's debut as a producer took place in 1991, when on the channel Ostankino there were broadcast the Super Show-1991 and the TV program Club T organized by him.  In 1992, Iosif Prigozhin became a producer of the singer Sona. In the same year, he produced the musical show dedicated to the European Championship on motoball in Vidnoye town.

In 1993 he initiated the creation of the Foundation "Father's home", which he headed until 1995. The members of the Board of Trustees were: Archbishop Sergiy of Solnechnogorsk, Chief mufti of Russia Ravil Gainutdin, Chief Rabbi of Russia Adolf Shaevich, the people's artist of the USSR, Tikhon Khrennikov, Alexandra Pakhmutova, Iosif Kobzon, Lyudmila Zykina, Makhmud Esambayev, scientists, lawyers. Charitable Foundation helped socially unprotected groups of the Russian population, attracted the public attention to the situation of refugees from neighboring countries and internally displaced persons. In 1996 I. Prigozhin was the producer of the concert dedicated to the Independence Day of Georgia, as well as the anniversary concerts dedicated to the 50th anniversary of creative endeavors of Lyudmila Zykina and the 10th anniversary of the group "A Studio", the first solo concerts of T. Bulanova in the Variety Theatre, the  "Golden Gramophone" Award (1996–1998). He was the Executive producer of the gala concert dedicated to the third anniversary of the ORT Channel (1998), gala concert in honor of the celebration of 8 March (1999). In May 1999, he was the producer of the groundbreaking ceremony of the star of the people's artist Georgy Vakhtangovich Kikabidze on "Stars Square" in honor of the 60th anniversary of the artist.

He created one of the largest Russian audio companies "ORT-records". From June 1997 to July 1999, Iosif Prigozhin was the general producer of the company, and from March 1998 to June 1999 – Director General. At the end of 1998, "ORT-records" was awarded the National Musical Award "Ovation" in the nomination "The best record company". Within a few months of work "ORT-records" released albums by Joseph Kobzon, Lev Leshchenko, Vakhtang Kikabidze, Alexander Marshal, Nikolai Noskov, Kris Kelmi, bands A'Studio, Na-Na, Splin, Bozhya Korovka, Otpetiye Moshenniki, Shao-Bao!, 2x2, Masha Rasputina, Alexey Glyzin, Yevgeny Osin, Valery Didula, Valery Syutkin, Alexander Serov, Alena Sviridova. In 1998 it was awarded the Ovation Award as the best producer of the year. The same year, the magazine "Company" recognized Iosif as the best businessman of the year in the field of show business.

On 1 June 2000, Iosif Prigozhin created the record label NOX Music (National United cultural community). As the head of the Nox Music, he was responsible for the production and release of albums of Russian artists, presentations of albums, organizing concerts in large concert venues.  Such artists as: Alyona Sviridova, Natalia Vlasova, the guitarist DiDulya, Alexander Marshal, Vakhtang Kikabidze, Nikolai Noskov, Kristina Orbakaite, Phillip Kirkorov, the group Gorky Park, Korol i Shut (The King and The Clown), band Vosmoye Marta (The Eighth of March), band Dyuna (The Dune), band A-Studio, band Kvartal (The Block), Masha Rasputina, Pascal, Lika Star, Yevgeny Osin, Avraam Russo, Andrei Makarevich, Victoria Morozova, Alexander Serov, Alexey Glyzin, Valery Syutkin have connected their creative endeavors with Iosif Prigozhin. The main actress representing Nox Music has become the singer Valeria. Her meeting with Iosif Prigozhin took place on 12 March 2003 and on 7 April of the same year they signed a contract on further cooperation.

At night 24 November 2002 Prigozhin was assaulted – his "Mercedes 220" was blown up on Tverskaya street. No one was injured in the explosion.

In 2004 he became General Director of the Russian record label REAL Records. In 2007 he became the producer and mastermind of the program "You are a superstar!" on the channel "NTV".

On 23 March 2011 the couple visited Ksenia Kiselyova who's seriously ill with two types of blood cancer in the city of Perm, and on the same day Valery gave a concert in honor of the girl. After that, the citizens of Perm as part of a charity venture "Let's Santa!" raised around 12 million rubles for the treatment of the girl. On 11 March 2014 Iosif Prigozhin signed the appeal of cultural figures of the Russian Federation in support of the policies of the Russian President Vladimir Putin against the annexation of Crimea and war in Ukraine.

Russian stars Iosif Prigozhin, Evelina Bledans, blogger Katrin Klimova, singer Yuri Loza and others supported Britney Spears.

Awards 
Since 1994, Iosif has been a member of the Association of music producers, Doctor of Arts of the Academy of Alternative Sciences. In 1998 he was awarded with the Award "Ovation" as the best "Producer of the year". In the same year the magazine "Company" found him "The best businessman" in the field of show business.

Private life 

 The first wife Elena Evgenyevna Prigozhina (born 1965) is a housewife from a wealthy family
 Two children: son Dmitry Prigozhin (born 1989) and daughter Danaya Prigozhina (born 1997)
 The mistress Leila Fattakhova (lived together for 7 years) — worked as a manager on the selection of artists in the "Soyuz" company, then became the owner of one of PR-agencies in Moscow
 Daughter Elizaveta Prigozhina (born 1999)
 The second wife, Valeria

Books 
In 2001 the publishing house "AST" issued the book by Iosif Prigozhin "Politics – the pinnacle of show business".

References

External link 

1969 births
Living people
Russian Jews
Russian record producers
People from Makhachkala
Russian Academy of Theatre Arts alumni
Mountain Jews